Maulana Tanveer-ul-Haq Thanvi son of Ehtisham ul Haq Thanvi is a Pakistani politician who has been a member of Senate of Pakistan, since May 2014.

Education
He has a degree of Bachelor of Arts which he received from the University of Karachi in 1978.

Political career
In September 2012, he was appointed president of the Muttahida Bain-ul-Muslimeen Forum.

He was elected to the Senate of Pakistan as a candidate of Muttahida Qaumi Movement from Sindh in May 2014 following the resignation of Syed Mustafa Kamal In April 2018, he Joined Pakistan Muslim League (N) after a meeting with Mushaid Hussain. Later he joined Pakistan Tehreek-e-Insaaf in March 2021.

References

Living people
Pakistani senators (14th Parliament)
Muttahida Qaumi Movement politicians
Year of birth missing (living people)
Deobandis